Louis Zorich (February 12, 1924 – January 30, 2018) was an American actor. He played sporting good salesman Burt Buchman, Paul Buchman's father, on the NBC series Mad About You from 1993 to 1999.

Early years
Zorich was born in Chicago, Illinois, the son of immigrants from Croatia, Anna (née Gledic) and Christ Zoric. He attended Earle Elementary School before going on to attend Roosevelt University and Goodman School of Drama at the Art Institute of Chicago (now at DePaul University) in his hometown of Chicago. Louis' nephew, Chris Zorich, played professional football. 

Zorich served in the U.S. Army during World War II.

Theatre 
Zorich made his Broadway debut in 1961 in Becket starring Laurence Olivier and Anthony Quinn.  In 1969 he played a "venal Italian cardinal" in Hadrian VII where he was nominated for a Tony Award.

In 1973 Zorich and his wife founded the Whole Theatre Company in Montclair, New Jersey — that state's first resident professional theater. They operated the theater for 18 years.

In the 1976 revival of They Knew What They Wanted, Zorich played middle-aged Napa Valley grape farmer Tony and was nominated for a Drama Desk Award.  Critic Douglas Watt wrote, "Zorich underlines the heartiness, canniness and energy of Tony -- even after he has suffered that crushing wedding-day accident --- in countless shrewd and effective details."  He played Mr. Maraczek in the 1993 Broadway musical revival She Loves Me. Critic Frank Scheck wrote, "...Louis Zorich is moving as the store owner trying to cope with the news of his wife's infidelity."  Zorich said in 1993, "Actors are by nature introverted, sensitive people, who can lead behind their characters.  Every time I walk on that stage I still get nervous."

Zorich was on the faculty of HB Studio in New York City. He also edited the anthology What Have You Done: The Inside Stories of Auditioning from the Ridiculous to the Sublime.

Film and television 
Zorich played the Russian Constable in the movie version of Fiddler on the Roof (1971) and a cab dispatcher in the comedy For Pete's Sake (1974).

In The Muppets Take Manhattan (1984), Zorich played a Greek restaurant owner. Critic Vincent Canby wrote, "Louis Zorich is funny as a nice, helpful, harassed coffee-shop owner who feeds the Muppets in their lean days..." In a TV adaptation of Death of a Salesman (1985), he played Ben, the older brother of Willy Loman. Zorich appeared as a millionaire in Dirty Rotten Scoundrels (1988) with Steve Martin, and played
a shady murder victim in the TV crime drama series Columbo.    He co-starred in the critically acclaimed comedy TV series Brooklyn Bridge as family patriarch Jules Berger. In a 1993 interview, Zorich was asked which assignment best matched his personality.  He said, "I think it would be Jules Bergen, the grandfather I played in Brooklyn Bridge.  By nature, I'm rather easygoing and tend to let thing slide."  Zorich mentioned that the series "afforded me the type of visibility that you can't always get in the theater..."

Personal life 
Zorich was married to Academy Award winning actress Olympia Dukakis for 56 years, from 1962 until his death. They had three children together. He died at his Manhattan apartment at the age of 93 on January 30, 2018.

Filmography

References

External links

 Moby Dick Album Details

1924 births
2018 deaths
20th-century American male actors
American male television actors
United States Army personnel of World War II
American people of Croatian descent
American people of Yugoslav descent
American male film actors
American male stage actors
American non-fiction writers
Dukakis family
Male actors from Chicago
Roosevelt University alumni